This is a collection of scientific, public opinion polls that have been conducted relating to the 2004 Russian presidential election.

2000 polls

2001 polls

2002 polls

2003 polls

2004 polls

Exit polls

Subnational polls

Central Federal District

Exit polls

Far Eastern Federal District

Exit polls

Moscow

Northwestern Federal District

Exit polls

Siberian Federal District

Exit polls

Southern Federal District

Exit polls

Ural Federal District

Exit polls

Volga Federal District

Exit polls

Sources

Opinion
Presidential
Russia